Lopharcha maurognoma is a species of moth of the family Tortricidae. It is found on the D'Entrecasteaux Islands near the eastern tip of New Guinea.

References

Lopharcha
Endemic fauna of Papua New Guinea
Moths of Papua New Guinea
D'Entrecasteaux Islands
Moths described in 1974